Cristian Quirante Catalán, better known by his stage name Alizzz, is a Spanish record producer, songwriter, and singer from Castelldefels, Catalunya. To date he has been awarded a total of 2 diamond, 35 platinum, and 6 gold certified for recordings produced in Spain and Internationally for his production work. In 2021 the Latin Grammy Awards nominated Alizzz for 6 awards including for Producer of the Year. and awarded him 3 Latin Grammy Awards including Latin Grammy Award for Best Pop/Rock Song, "Hong Kong" by C. Tangana, featuring Andres Calamaro, Best Alternative Song for "Nominao", by C. Tangana featuring Jorge Drexler, and the Latin Grammy Award for Best Engineered Album.

History 
Alizzz's career started in 2012 with the release of the single "Neon Lights", released via the UK label MofoHifi. Following his Whoa! EP, for Spanish label Arkestra, at the end of 2013 he signed to Diplo's Mad Decent, through which he released the Sunshine EP, and shortly after began touring internationally. In 2015, he released the single "Your Love" on digital label Moving Castle, from the USA. In June 2018, Alizzz headlined Sónar festival's 25th anniversary edition.

In 2020, Alizzz launched a new solo artistic project, showcasing his singing and interpretation alongside his writing and producing, to date he has released songs featuring Spanish singer Amaia (singer). and long term music partner C. Tangana.    His debut album "Tiene que haber algo más" was released on his own label through a distribution deal with Warner Music Spain.

Collaborations 
Alizzz's first production work was in 2016, with C. Tangana and Rosalia, with whom he wrote and produced the singles "Antes de Morirme" and "Llámame más tarde". He continued to work with C. Tangana, eventually producing his debut album, ÍDOLO, which was produced and recorded between September 2016 and June 2017. In June 2017, the C. Tangana song, produced by Alizzz, "Mala Mujer" was released, and went on to be awarded triple platinum in Spain. The track "Tú Me Dejaste De Querer", performed by C. Tangana, Niño de Elche and La Húngara, produced by Alizzz, became the first Spanish release to receive a Gold Certification in its first week of release.

In February 2021 C.Tangana released his second album El Madrileño, again produced by Alizzz. For the week of its release the album was the most streamed album in Spain and globally on Spotify.

Whoa! Music 
In January 2019, Alizzz launched Whoa! Music, a record label, in partnership with Warner Records Spain. The concept of the label is to develop and release Spanish and Latin American artists from the "new pop" scene. Artists signed to the label include Alizzz, Paula Cendejas, Coral Casino and Robie.

Discography

Production credits 
ALBUMS

 Amaia - Cuando No Sé Quién Soy (album) Universal Music (2022)
 C. Tangana - El Madrileño (album) Sony Records (2021)
C. Tangana – Ídolo (album) Sony Records (2017)

EP's

 Angela Torres - La Niña De Fuego / Warner Music Argentina S.A (2021)
C. Tangana – Bien :-( Sony Records (2020)
SINGLES

Amaia - Quiero Pero No (featuring Rojuu) / Universal Music Spain (2021)
C. Tangana - Ateo feat. Nathy Peluso / Sony Music Spain (2021)
Amaia - Yo Invito / Universal Music Spain (2021)
Natti Natasha - Arrebatá / Sony Music Entertainment US Latin (2021)
C. Tangana - Yate / Sony Music Spain (2021) 
Ms Nina - Si Quieres / Universal Music Spain (2021)
Princesa Alba - Lo Siento Quemasucabeza (2021)
Sen Senra - Qué Facilidad  / Universal Music Spain (2021)
C. Tangana - Párteme La Cara feat Ed Maverick / Sony Music Spain (2021)
C. Tangana - Los Tontos feat Andrés Calamaro / Sony Music Spain (2021)
C. Tangana - Nominao feat Jorge Drexler / Sony Music Spain (2021)
C. Tangana - Comerte Entera / Sony Music Spain (2021)
Paula Cendejas - El Pacto / Warner Music Spain (2021)
Princesa Alba - Dame / Whoa Music (2020)
C. Tangana - Tú Me Dejaste De Querer ft. Niño de Elche & La Húngara / Sony Music Spain (2020)
Angela Torres - Flotando / Warner Music Argentina S.A (2020)
C. Tangana - Demasiadas Mujeres / Sony Music Spain (2020)
C. Tangana - Ojalá / Sony Music Spain (2020)
Angela Torres - Guapo / Warner Music Argentina S.A (2020)
Paula Cendejas feat. C. Tangana - Como habla una mujer / Warner Music Spain (2020)
Angela Torres - Allo / Warner Music Argentina S.A (2020)
Lola Indigo - Mala Cara / Universal Music Spain (2020)
C. Tangana - Yelo /  Sony Music Spain (2020)
C. Tangana - Guille Asesino / Sony Music Spain (2020)
C. Tangana - Nunca Estoy / Sony Music Spain (2020)
Robie - Búscame Whoa! Music / Warner Music Spain (2020)
St. Pedro - Phone Sex / Interscope Records (2020)
Paula Cendejas - Gotitas al Viento feat. Feid / Warner Music Spain (2020)
Rels B Featuring Nathy Peluso - No Se Perdona / Sony Music Spain (2020)
Princesa Alba - Me Equivoqué / self release (2020)
C. Tangana - Yelo / Sony Music Spain (2020)
Princesa Alba - Mi Culpa / self release (2020)
C. Tangana, Darrell - Pronto Llegará / Sony Music Spain (2019)
C. Tangana, Duki, Polima Westcoast, Neo Pista - 5stars / Sony Music Spain (2019)
C. Tangana, Darrell - Pronto Llegará / Sony Music Spain (2019)
Paula Cendejas - Olvidate / Warner Music Spain (2019)
C. Tangana featuring Paloma Mami - No te debi besar / Sony Music Spain (2019)
Piso 21 featuring Christian Nodal - Pa' Olvidarme De Ella  / Warner Music Mexico (2019)
Cupido featuring Lola Indigo y Alizzz - Autoestima - Remix / Primavera Labels / Universal Music Spain (2019)
Paula Cendejas featuring Mario Bautista - 10 Minutos / Warner Music Spain (2019)
Robie - Solo a ti / Whoa! Music / Warner Music Spain (2019)
Robie - ¿Qué Será? / Whoa! Music / Warner Music Spain (2019)
Aitana feat. Lola Indigo - Me Quedo / Universal Music Spain (2019)
Paula Cendejas - Ya Te Avisé / Whoa! Music / Warner Music Spain (2019)
C. Tangana - Para Repartir / Sony Records (2019)
Coral Casino - Rally (feat Alizzz) / Whoa! Music / Warner Music Spain (2019)
Feid - Buena Mala / Universal Music Latino (2019)
 Ana Torroja – Llama / Promotodo México (2019)
 Paula Cendejas – Sal De Mi Cabeza / Whoa! Music / Warner Music Spain (2019)
 C. Tangana y Dellafuente – París / Sony Records (2019)
 C. Tangana y MC Bin Laden – Pa' Llamar Tu Atención / Sony Records (2019)
 Gabriela Richardson  – Crime / Sony Records Spain (2019)
 Becky G – Booty Featuring C. Tangana / Sony Records Spain (2018)
 Maikel Delacalle – El Problema / Universal Records (2018)
 Maikel Delacalle – Latinoamericana / Universal Records (2018)
 C. Tangana – Llorando en la Limo / Sony Records (2018)
 Jesse Báez – No Eres Tu feat C. Tangana / Universal (2018)
 Javiera Mena – Espejo (single) / Sony Music 2018
 Doja Cat – Down Low / RCA Records
 Javiera Mena – Cerca (single) / Sony Music 2018
 Javiera Mena – Aire (single) / Sony Music 2018
 C. Tangana – No Te Pegas feat. A.CHAL / Sony Music (2018)
 C. Tangana y Dellafuente – Guerrera / Sony Music (2017)
 C. Tangana – Demasiado Tarde (single) / Sony Music (2017)
 C. Tangana – Tiempo / Sony Music (2017)
 C. Tangana – De Pie / Sony Music (2017)
 C. Tangana – Pop Ur Pussy / Sony Music (2017)
 C. Tangana – Mala Mujer / Sony Music (2017)
 C. Tangana – Persiguiéndonos/ Agorazein (2016)
 Rosalía y C. Tangana  – Antes de Morirme / Agorazein (2016)
Rosalia y C. Tangana – Llámame más tarde / Agorazein (2016)

Certifications 

Alizzz' productions have been awarded the following Music recording certifications:

Albums

C. Tangana – El Madrileño / Sony Records (2021)

 Platinum Spain

Singles

C. Tangana – Parteme La Cara feat Ed Maverick / Sony Records (2021)

 Gold Spain

C. Tangana – Ingobernable (feat Gipsy Kings / Sony Records (2020)
 2 x Platinum Spain
C. Tangana – Los Tontos / Sony Records (2020)
 1 x Platinum Spain
C. Tangana – Comerte Entera feat Toquihno / Sony Records (2020)
 Gold Spain

C. Tangana – Tu Me Dejaste de Querer / Sony Records (2020)

 6× Platinum Spain

C. Tangana – Demasidas Mujeres / Sony Records (2020)

3 x Platinum Spain

C. Tangana – Nunca Estoy / Sony Records (2020)

3 x Platinum Spain

C. Tangana y Paloma Mami – No Te Debí Besar / Sony Records (2019)

2 x Platinum Spain
Gold  USA

Aitana featuring Lola Indigo – Me Quedo / Universal Music Spain (2019)

Platinum Spain

C. Tangana y Dellafuente – París / Sony Records (2019)

Gold Spain
Piso 21 featuring Christian Nodal - Pa' Olvidarme De Ella / Warner Music Mexico (2019)

 2x Diamante Mex

MC Bin Laden, C. Tangana & Alizzz – Pa Llamar / Sony Records (2019)

Platinum Spain

Becky G Featuring C. Tangana & Alizzz – Booty / Sony Records (2018)

 3xPlatinum: Spain
2xPlatinum: US

C. Tangana – Llorando en la Limo / Sony Records (2018)

 Platinum: Spain

Dellafuente y C. Tangana – Guerrera / Sony Music (2017)

 2xPlatinum: Spain

C. Tangana – De Pie / Sony Music (2017)

 Gold: Spain

C. Tangana – Mala Mujer / Sony Music (2017) (ÍDOLO Album)

 Gold: Chile, Argentina, Mexico
 3xPlatinum: Spain

C. Tangana – Antes de Morirme Featuring Rosalia / Agorazein (2016) 

 4xPlatinum: Spain

References

External links 

Alizzz – website

Spanish hip hop DJs
Living people
1984 births
Latin music record producers